Station Hill is a road and ongoing redevelopment project in Reading, Berkshire, England. It sits next to the Thames Tower by the Reading Rail Station.

Redevelopment
In 2012, the Station Hill project passed to a joint venture between Benson Elliot and Stanhope from John Madejski, who bought the site in 2005. In February, they released a new £400m plan to be displayed to the public. After the exhibition at the Town Hall, the developers said that the plans had received a positive response. 

As of June 2018, Station Hill became a joint venture between Lincoln Property Company and MGT Investment Management (known as Lincoln MGT). The BBC reported that the development was bought for close to £70 million from Sackville Developments.

Lincoln MGT's proposals for Station Hill comprise up to 625,000 sq ft best-in-class office space, 1,300 private and affordable homes, 95,000 sq ft of new lifestyle-led retail and leisure space, including potential for a 200-bed hotel and later living accommodation, and a central two-acre piazza. 

The development is split into three phases, with construction for the first two phases underway as of 2022 and the third having received outline planning permission. 

Phase One is due for completion in the fourth quarter of 2023 and Phase Two in early-2024.

References

External links 

 Capital Properties (UK) Ltd - asset management, placemaking and events

Buildings and structures in Reading, Berkshire
Proposed skyscrapers in England